Progastricsin also known as pepsinogen C or pepsinogen II is a pepsinogen precursor of the enzyme gastricsin that in humans is encoded by the PGC gene.

Function 
Progastricsin is an aspartic proteinase that belongs to the peptidase family A1. The encoded protein is a digestive enzyme that is produced in the stomach and constitutes a major component of the gastric mucosa. This protein is also secreted into the serum. This protein is synthesized as an inactive zymogen that includes a highly basic prosegment. This enzyme is converted into its active mature form at low pH by sequential cleavage of the prosegment that is carried out by the enzyme itself.

Clinical significance 
Polymorphisms in this gene are associated with susceptibility to gastric cancers. Serum levels of this enzyme are used as a biomarker for certain gastric diseases including Helicobacter pylori related gastritis.

See also 
 Pepsinogen

References

Further reading 

EC 3.4.23